Vânători is a commune located in Mehedinți County, Oltenia, Romania. It is composed of two villages: Roșiori and Vânători. It also included Braniștea and Goanța villages until 2004, when they were split off to form Braniștea Commune.

References

Communes in Mehedinți County
Localities in Oltenia